La Démocratie sociale ('Social Democracy') was a French language radical and republican weekly newspaper published from Basse-Terre, Guadeloupe. La Démocratie sociale was founded in 1909, as an organ of the Candacist party. It was initially edited by Vital Borifax. As of 1937, its director was Charles Moynac.

References

French-language newspapers published in North America
Newspapers published in Guadeloupe
Publications established in 1909